T.192 is a technical standard, for cooperative document handling, including joint synchronous editing and joint document presentation/viewing published in 1998, it was developed by the Standardization Sector of the International Telecommunication Union (ITU-T). The standard builds upon the Open Document Architecture by expanding it to enable joined document editing.

References

ITU-T recommendations
ITU-T T Series Recommendations